Asaccus saffinae is a species of lizard in the family Phyllodactylidae. It is endemic to Iraq.

References

Asaccus
Reptiles of Iraq
Endemic fauna of Iraq
Reptiles described in 2009